L. C. (Len) Tyler (born 1951) is a British writer of comic crime fiction. His Elsie and Ethelred mysteries feature Ethelred Tressider, a crime writer, and Elsie Thirkettle, his literary agent.

Biography 
Born 1951, Tyler was raised in Southend-on-Sea, Essex and studied geography at Jesus College, Oxford University (matriculating in 1971), before going on to study systems analysis at City University in London.  He worked for the British Council in Malaysia, Sudan, Thailand and Denmark, before becoming Chief Executive of the Royal College of Paediatrics and Child Health, then a full-time writer. Tyler's 2007 novel The Herring Seller's Apprentice was nominated for an Edgar Award for "Best Paperback Original". In 2015 LC Tyler was elected Chair of the Crime Writers' Association. He won the Goldsboro Last Laugh Award both in 2010, for The Herring in the Library, and in 2015, for Crooked Herring. The Herring Seller’s Apprentice and Ten Little Herrings were nominated for Edgar Allan Poe Awards.

References

External links 

 Personal website
 Author in the Spotlight at Amazon
 Review of The Herring Seller's Apprentice at EuroCrime
 Podcast interview
 100 Ways to Write a Book - 100 authors in conversation with Alex Pearl about their backgrounds, motivations and working methods

Living people
English crime fiction writers
Alumni of Jesus College, Oxford
Alumni of City, University of London
People from Southend-on-Sea
1951 births